Francesco Capelli (active c. 1568) was an Italian painter. He was born in Sassuolo in the province of Modena, and was educated in the school of Correggio. He painted a 'Madonna and Child in Glory with attendant Saints' for the church of San Sebastian at Sassuolo. He was also called Caccianemici, but must not be confounded with another Francesco Caccianemici, a contemporary pupil of Primaticcio, and lived about the same period.

References

16th-century Italian painters
Italian male painters
Renaissance painters
Painters from Modena
Year of death missing
Year of birth missing